HD 147506 is a magnitude 8.7 F8 dwarf star that is somewhat larger and hotter than the Sun.  The star is approximately 419 light years from Earth and is positioned near the keystone of Hercules. It is estimated to be 2 to 3 billion years old. There is one known transiting extrasolar planet.

The star HD 147506 is named Hunor. The name was selected in the NameExoWorlds campaign by Hungary, during the 100th anniversary of the IAU. Hunor was a legendary ancestor of the Huns and the Hungarian nation, and brother of Magor (name of the planet HD 147506 b).

Variability
In addition to being a planetary transit variable there is also stellar pulsations induced by the planet. This is the first known instance of a planet inducing pulsations in its host star. The amplitude is very small at approximately 40 parts per million. These pulsations correspond to exact harmonics of the planet's orbital frequency, indicating they are of a tidal origin.

Planetary system
Orbiting the star is HAT-P-2b, which was at the time of its discovery the most massive transiting extrasolar planet. At almost 9 times the mass of Jupiter and an estimated surface temperature of ~900 kelvins, on a 5.6 day orbit, this planet is unlike any previously discovered transiting planet.  The planet has a large mass (nine times the mass of Jupiter), and a surface gravity 25 times that exerted by the Earth.  Its orbital eccentricity is very large (e = 0.5). Since tidal forces should have reduced the orbital eccentricity of this planet it was speculated that another massive planet found outside the orbit of HAT-P-2b is in orbital resonance with HAT-P-2b. Additional measurements taken over six years show a long-term linear trend in the radial velocity data consistent with a companion of 15 Jupiter masses or greater. Adaptive optics images were taken at the Keck telescope and when combined with the radial velocity data show the maximum mass of the companion is that of an M dwarf star.

The planet was discovered by the HATNet Project and the researchers there believed the planet to be 10-20% larger than Jupiter. This discovery is important as it provides further support for the existing theory of planetary structure.

An additional planet has been proposed perturbing HAT-P-2b, but it is unconfirmed.

See also
 List of transiting extrasolar planets

References

Durchmusterung objects
147506
080076
Hercules (constellation)
F-type main-sequence stars
Planetary systems with one confirmed planet
Planetary transit variables